Eileen Hoffmann (born 25 June 1984) is a German field hockey player who competed in the 2008 Summer Olympics.

References

External links
 

1984 births
Living people
German female field hockey players
Olympic field hockey players of Germany
Field hockey players at the 2008 Summer Olympics
20th-century German women
21st-century German women